The 1994 Italian general election was held on  27 and 28 March 1994 to elect members of the Chamber of Deputies and the Senate of the Republic for the 12th legislature. Silvio Berlusconi's centre-right coalition won a large majority in the Chamber of Deputies but just missed winning a majority in the Senate. The Italian People's Party, the renamed Christian Democracy (DC), which had dominated Italian politics for almost half a century, was decimated. It took only 29 seats versus 206 for the DC two years earlier—easily the worst defeat a sitting government in Italy has ever suffered, and one of the worst ever suffered by a Western European governing party.

New electoral system
A new electoral system was introduced in these elections, after a referendum in 1993 which repealed the "supermajority clause" concerning Senate elections. The clause had meant that Senate elections were conducted using de facto pure proportional representation. As a result of this change, the Senate now elected 75% of its seats via plurality voting system in single-member constituencies, with the remaining 25% assigned proportionally in a compensatory nature. Parliament passed a new electoral law for the Chamber of Deputies to bring it more in line with the Senate, assigning 75% of the seats via plurality voting, with the remaining 25% assigned proportionally in a supplementary manner using a minimum threshold of 4% of the vote. The new electoral system was nicknamed Mattarellum after Sergio Mattarella, who was the official proponent.

Background

In 1992, the five pro-Western governing parties (Christian Democracy, the Italian Socialist Party, the Italian Social-Democratic Party, the Italian Republican Party, and the Italian Liberal Party) lost much of their electoral strength almost overnight due to a large number of judicial investigations concerning the financial corruption of many of their foremost members. This led to a general expectation that upcoming elections would be won by the Democratic Party of the Left, the heirs to the former Italian Communist Party, and their Alliance of Progressives coalition unless there was an alternative.

 
On 26 January 1994, the media magnate Silvio Berlusconi announced his decision to enter politics, ("enter the field", in his own words) presenting his own political party, Forza Italia, on a platform focused on defeating "the communists." His political aim was to convince the voters of the Pentapartito, i.e. the usual five governing parties who were shocked and confused by Mani Pulite scandals, that Forza Italia offered both novelty and the continuation of the pro-Western free-market policies followed by Italy since the end of World War II.

Shortly after he decided to enter the political arena, investigators into the Mani Pulite affair were said to be close to issuing warrants for the arrest of Berlusconi and senior executives of his business group. During his years of political career Berlusconi has repeatedly stated that the Mani Pulite investigations were led by communist prosecutors who wanted to establish a Soviet-style government in Italy.

In order to win the election, Berlusconi formed two separate electoral alliances: Pole of Freedoms (Polo delle Libertà) with the Northern League (Lega Nord) in northern Italian districts, and another, the Pole of Good Government (Polo del Buon Governo), with the post-fascist National Alliance (Alleanza Nazionale; heir to the Italian Social Movement) in central and southern regions. In a shrewd pragmatic move, he did not ally with the latter in the North because the League disliked them. As a result, Forza Italia was allied with two parties that were not allied with each other.

Berlusconi launched a massive campaign of electoral advertisements on his three TV networks. He subsequently won the elections, with Forza Italia garnering 21% of the popular vote, the highest percentage of any single party. One of the most significant promises that he made in order to secure victory was that his government would create "one million more jobs".

On the other side, the center-left Alliance of Progressive led by Achille Occhetto, also called the Joyful War Machine, was composed by the two party born from the dissolution of the Italian Communist Party: the Democratic Party of the Left and Communist Refoundation Party. 
Since the alliance was sure of victory, based his campaign accusing the communicative power of Silvio Berlusconi.

Main coalitions and parties

Coalitions' leaders

Results
Berlusconi's coalition won a decisive victory over the progressive one, becoming the first centre-right alliance to win a general election in Italy since the end of the Second World War. The Pole of Freedoms won in the main regions of Italy: in the North the strongest parties were the regionalist Northern League and Forza Italia, which was also able to win in all provinces of Sicily, while in the South the National Alliance received more votes. The Alliance of Progressive confirmed its predominance in the "Red Belt" regions of central Italy, and in the South.

Chamber of Deputies

Overall results

Detailed results

FPTP results by constituency

PR results by constituency

Senate of the Republic

Overall results

Detailed results

FPTP by constituency

PR results by constituency

Maps

Leaders' races

Aftermath
Contrary to its success in the Chamber, the Pole failed to win a majority in the Senate. Nevertheless, the Berlusconi I Cabinet obtained a vote of confidence also in the Senate, thanks to the abstention of four PPI senators (Vittorio Cecchi Gori, Stefano Cusumano, Luigi Grillo and Tomaso Zanoletti), who decided not to take part in the vote.

The vote of the Senators for life was not decisive, as three (Gianni Agnelli, Francesco Cossiga and Giovanni Leone) voted in favour of the government, three were absent (Carlo Bo, Norberto Bobbio and Amintore Fanfani) and five voted against (Giulio Andreotti, Francesco De Martino, Giovanni Spadolini, Paolo Emilio Taviani and Leo Valiani).

The Senate finally gave Berlusconi 159 votes in favour and 153 against.

Further reading

References

Notes

External links
 Minister of Internal Affairs of Italy: 1994 Election Results, Chamber of Deputies - uninominal (compressed ZIP file)
 Ministry of Internal Affairs of Italy: 1994 Election Results, Chamber of Deputies - proportional
 Minister of Internal Affairs of Italy: 1994 Election Results, Senate of the Republic

1994
General election
March 1994 events in Europe